This is a list of electoral results for the electoral district of Theodore in Queensland state elections.

Members for Theodore

Election results

Elections in the 2020s

Elections in the 2010s

References

Queensland state electoral results by district